King Hiss (spelled King Hsss in the 2002 version, and sometimes King Hsssss) is a fictional supervillain, and the ruthless king of the Snake Men in Mattel toyline He-Man and the Masters of the Universe. Although he never appeared in the original animated series by Filmation itself, Hiss made a belated animated debut in the 2002 revamped He-Man animated series Masters of the Universe vs. The Snakemen by Mike Young Productions, as the main villain of the second season. In both incarnations his default appearance is human but he is capable of shedding his skin revealing everything from his waist up to be a writhing mass of serpents. Hiss possesses a host of somewhat vague magical powers.

History 
According to the original toys' minicomics, King Hiss was the ruler of a race of interstellar conquerors. Although his people were a race of humanoid snakes, Hiss for some unexplained reason had the default appearance of a human, a notional disguise to hide his true form of an upper body comprised several intertwined serpents (although one head is clearly central and dominant, the 2002 MYP animated series depicts all five heads speaking in unison). Hiss and his Snake Men were fighting a protracted war of conquest on the planet Eternia, when they were eventually overcome by the combined magic powers of the planet's Elders.

The Elders' magic flung King Hiss and his army into a limbo-like dimension. While being trapped outside of normal time, Hiss and his minions did not seem to age. Centuries in limbo with his serpentine underlings also gave King Hiss the ability to shed his human disguise and become a hideous being composed of squirming five snakes of heads. After millennia of imprisonment, King Hiss was freed by his right-hand man General Rattlor and a descendant of the original Snake Men, Kobra Khan. Skeletor's base Snake Mountain had formerly been King Hiss's headquarters (and the petrified body of Serpos, the god of the Snake Men) and he, King Hiss, temporarily took Snake Mountain over. The two villains formed an uneasy alliance, so they might conquer Eternia and destroy its champion He-Man.

King Hiss was unable to free his entire army, however some Snake Men rallied to him. They were Kobra Khan, Tung Lashor, Rattlor, Snake Face, and Sssqueeze (sometimes called Tanglor).

King Hiss' personality in the 2002 cartoon was best described as tyrannical but somewhat honorable. While indeed power-hungry and ruthless, Kobra Khan described him as being as generous to his friends as he was merciless to his enemies. Unlike Skeletor who regularly abused and humiliated his minion, King Hiss respects his minions as he praised and congratulated them as appropriate. In return, the Snake Men were fiercely loyal to him, ignoring any personal ambitions they might have in order to serve their leader out of sincere devotion.

Appearances

Masters of the Universe vs. The Snakemen
In Masters of the Universe vs. The Snakemen, The Sorceress describes King Hsss as wielding magic as great of that of the Elders. King Hsss was defeated by Hordak and his minions in the times of King Grayskull. Ages later, King Hsss and his henchmen were sealed away beneath Snake Mountain (which King Hsss built) by Zodak, to be released during the reign of King Randor by Kobra Khan, General  Rattlor, and Evil-Lyn. From there, King Hsss serves as the main antagonist of the second season.

Other Media 
King Hiss appeared in the game He-Man: The Most Powerful Game in the Universe.

Reception
Comic Book Resources listed the character as part of He-Man: 15 Most Powerful Masters of the Universe.

King Hiss was voted No.11 in The 14 Least Masterful Masters of the Universe by Io9. IGN recommended that King Hsss be a character introduced into any potential Masters of the Univerese movie franchise. King Hsss was voted 7th out 7 in the 7 Stupidest He-Man Characters by Total Film.

References

Villains in animated television series
Extraterrestrial supervillains
Fictional anthropomorphic characters
Fictional characters introduced in 1986
Fictional characters who can stretch themselves
Fictional characters who use magic
Fictional commanders
Fictional humanoids
Fictional snakes
Fictional kings
Masters of the Universe Snake Men
Male characters in animated series
Male supervillains